Idhu Kadhal Varum Paruvam ( It's an age of love) is a 2006 Indian Tamil-language film directed by Kasthuri Raja. Idhu Kaadhal Varum Paruvam targeted at the youth, is a bubbly film chronicling the coming of age of a teenager who is a school student.

Plot
Surya, the school-going 15 -year old boy finds himself attracted towards his classmate Raji. Later he gets infatuated with a model Manasi (Kiran Rathod). Finally, his lust grows for a call girl Swarna (Lakshmi Priya).

As Swarna's husband is a pimp, she also shows some interest towards Surya. Surya and Swarna elope. But towards the end Swarna turns to preach. She advises Surya to be a good role model student and also to return to his parents.

Cast
Arish Kumar as Surya
Kiran Rathod as Manasi 
Karunas
Lakshmi Priya as Swarna
Baba Bhaskar as Ajees

Production
The songs are shot in different places, including Rameswaram, Kumbakkarai, Visakhapatnam, Kodaikkanal, Manjalaru Anai and Theni.

Soundtrack
Kasthuri Raja made his debut as music composer with this film and also written lyrics for all songs.
"Yugam Yugamai" — Aishwarya Kishore
"Sollamal Mudivatha" — Prasanna
"15 Vayasu" — Nitish Gopalan, Lavanya
"Paada Paduthum" — Jayadev, Padmalatha
"Kanja Adikalada" — Jayadev
"Kadhal Kadhal" — Nitish Gopalan, Anuradha Sriram

References

2006 films
2000s Tamil-language films
Indian coming-of-age films
Films directed by Kasthuri Raja
2000s coming-of-age films